Adalbert Bezzenberger (14 April 1851 – 31 October 1922) was a German philologist. He was born at Kassel and died at Königsberg. He is considered to be the founder of Baltic philology.

He studied the Indo-Germanic languages at the universities of Göttingen and Munich. In 1874 he became lecturer at Göttingen and in 1879 professor of Sanskrit at the University of Königsberg. From 1890-91 he was rector of this university.

Published works 
His principal works include:
 Beiträge zur Geschichte der Litauischen Sprache auf Grund litauischer Texte des 16. und 17. Jahrhunderts, Göttingen: Peppmüller, 1877.
 Litauische Forschungen. Beiträge zur Kenntniss der Sprache und des Volkstumes der Litauer, Göttingen: Peppmüller, 1882.
 Lettische Dialektstudien, Göttingen: Vandenhoeck & Ruprecht, 1885.
 Über der Sprache der Preußischen Letten, Göttingen: Vandenhoeck & Ruprecht, 1888.
 Die Kurische Nehrung und ihre Bewohner, Stuttgart: Engelhorn, 1889 (=Forschungen zur deutschen Landes- und Volkskunde; vols. 3-4)
 Sitzungsbericht der Altertumsgeschichte Prussia (1892)
 Analysen vorgeschichtlicher Bronzen Ostpreussens. An ihrem 60jährigen Stiftungstage dem Andenken ihres ehemaligen Vorsitzenden Georg Bujak gewidmet von der Altertumsgesellschaft Prussia, Königsberg: Gräfe & Unzer, 1904. (as editor)
 Beiträge zur Kunde der Indogermanischen Sprachen (1877-1906; as editor)

Sources

External links
 

1851 births
1922 deaths
Balticists
Ludwig Maximilian University of Munich alumni
University of Göttingen alumni
German philologists
Linguists of Indo-European languages
Writers from Kassel
People from the Electorate of Hesse
Academic staff of the University of Königsberg
German male writers
Members of the Göttingen Academy of Sciences and Humanities